Tasadohang station (Tasado Port station) is a freight-only railway station in Tasa Workers' District, Yŏmju County, North P'yŏngan Province, North Korea, the terminus of the Tasado Line of the Korean State Railway. The line continues beyond the station to siding at Kwakkot Ch'oe Harbour to serve the base of the Korean People's Navy Unit 164 located there.

History
The station was opened on 31 October 1939 by the Tasado Railway, along with the rest of the Tasado Line from Sinŭiju to here.

References

Railway stations in North Korea
Buildings and structures in North Pyongan Province
Railway stations opened in 1939
1939 establishments in Korea